The Arquivos Históricos Nacionais da República da Guiné-Bissau (AHN; English: National Historical Archives of Guinea-Bissau) formed on 10 November 1984 per government decree 31/84.

History
Some of the AHN's collection derives from the colonial-era Centro de Estudos da Guine Portugesa.

During the Guinea-Bissau Civil War, the archives suffered destruction and damage to more than half of its holdings.

See also
 National Library of Guinea-Bissau
 History of Guinea-Bissau

References

This article incorporates information from the Portuguese Wikipedia.

External links
 Official site
 

1984 establishments in Guinea-Bissau
History of Guinea-Bissau
Guinea-Bissau